The Change Indonesia Movement Party, better known as the Garuda Party, is a political party in Indonesia that contested the 2019 general election. The party has been linked to the family of former president Suharto. Officials have denied the party is linked to the Suharto family or to former general Prabowo Subianto's Gerindra Party. Garuda declared itself to be neutral in the April 2019 presidential election, although some of its officials and legislative candidates voiced support for Prabowo.

Background
In 2007, former information minister Harmoko, also a former chairman of Golkar, founded the National People’s Party (PKN), which failed to qualify for the 2009 general election. In April 2015, PKN was renamed the Change Indonesia Movement Party (Garuda). The party’s constitution, bylaws, symbol and senior figures were all changed,  making it unrecognizable from PKN.

Garuda Party was registered with the Ministry of Justice and Human Rights on 16 April 2015. The party espouses a nationalist platform.

Little was known of the party's leaders or policies prior to its registration for the 2019 election being accepted by the General Elections Commission (KPU) in October 2017. Party chairman Ahmad Ridha Sabana has said Garuda Party is a party of young people who want to contribute to national development.

According to KPU data, Garuda Party has 693,191 members across 509 of Indonesia's 514 regencies, and 36.36% of its members are women.

Key personnel 
 Chairman: Ahmad Ridha Sabana.
 Secretary General: Abdullah Mansuri. He is chairman of the Indonesian Market Traders Association (IKAPPI). He is the subject of several articles on cendananews.com, a news portal that reports on the activities of Suharto's children.

Election results

Legislative election results

Presidential election results

Note: Bold text suggests the party's member

Controversies
Garuda Party chairman Ahmad Ridha Sabana in February 2018 denied media reports that the party was linked to Tutut Suharto. He said Garuda is independent and was “built by youths”. He admitted to working for Tutut in the past but said he was no longer president director of her TPI (now MNCTV) television network. He also denied his party was connected to Gerindra Party, although he acknowledged he had in 2014 stood as a Gerindra candidate for the Jakarta provincial legislative assembly. He also admitted his brother Ahmad Riza Patria was a Gerindra politician.

Ridha denied Garuda Party’s name and mythical garuda bird emblem were deliberately similar to Gerindra’s name and garuda bird logo. He also rejected claims that Garuda Party’s bird design resembles the  Nazi party's eagle emblem.

References

Political parties established in 2015
Pancasila political parties